Edmílson Barros de Souza or simply Edmílson  (born December 9, 1977 in Coxim), is a former Brazilian central defender.

Honours
Mato Grosso do Sul State League: 2000, 2003

Contract
1 January 2007 to 30 June 2009

External links
 CBF
 sambafoot
 palmeiras.globo.com
 Guardian Stats Centre
 globoesporte
 zerozero.pt

1977 births
Living people
Brazilian footballers
Associação Atlética Internacional (Limeira) players
Goiás Esporte Clube players
Centro Sportivo Alagoano players
Esporte Clube Noroeste players
Paraná Clube players
Sociedade Esportiva Palmeiras players
Madureira Esporte Clube players
Clube Atlético Sorocaba players

Association football defenders